This is a partial discography of the Singspiel Die Entführung aus dem Serail by Wolfgang Amadeus Mozart, which was premiered at the Burgtheater in Vienna on 16 July 1782.

Recordings

References
Notes

Sources
Recordings of Die Entführung aus dem Serail on operadis-opera-discography.org.uk

Opera discographies
Operas by Wolfgang Amadeus Mozart